"Fame and Fortune" is a 1960 song by Elvis Presley. It was written by Fred Wise (lyrics) and Ben Weisman (music) and published by Presley's company Gladys Music, Inc.

Presley recorded it on March 21, 1960, in the RCA Studio B in Nashville, Tennessee. He also sang it on the TV special The Frank Sinatra Timex Show: Welcome Home Elvis (recorded March 26, 1960, and aired on May 12 of that year).

The song was first released on a single as the flipside to "Stuck on You" (RCA 47 7740). It was Presley's first post-Army single. "Fame and Fortune" peaked at number 17 on the Billboard Hot 100 on the week of May 5, 1960, while "Stuck on You" spent several weeks at number 1.

In the United States the single "Stuck on You" (backed with "Fame and Fortune") was certified Gold by RIAA for selling over 1 million copies.

Musical style and lyrics 
"Fame and Fortune" is a ballad.

Charts

References

External links 
 Elvis Presley – "Stuck on You" at Discogs

1960s ballads
1960 songs
1960 singles
Elvis Presley songs
RCA Records singles
Songs with lyrics by Fred Wise (songwriter)
Songs with music by Ben Weisman
Pop ballads
Rock ballads